Chequers, or Chequers Court, is the country house of the Prime Minister of the United Kingdom. A 16th-century manor house in origin, it is located near the village of Ellesborough, halfway between Princes Risborough and Wendover in Buckinghamshire, United Kingdom, at the foot of the Chiltern Hills. Chequers has been the country home of the serving Prime Minister since 1921 after the estate was given to the nation by Sir Arthur Lee by a Deed of Settlement, given full effect in the Chequers Estate Act 1917. The house is listed Grade I on the National Heritage List for England.

Origin of the name
The name "Chequers" may derive from an early owner of the manor of Ellesborough in the 12th century, Elias Ostiarius (or de Scaccario). The name "Ostiarius" meant an usher of the Court of the Exchequer and scacchiera means a chessboard in Italian. Elias Ostiarius's coat of arms included the chequer board of the Exchequer, so the estate may be named after his arms and position at court. The house passed through generations of the Scaccario family (spelt many different ways) until it passed into the D'Awtrey family, whose name was eventually anglicised to Hawtrey.

Alternatively, the house could have been named after the chequer trees (Sorbus torminalis) that grow in its grounds. There is a reference to this in the book Elizabeth: Apprenticeship by David Starkey, which describes the early life of Elizabeth I.

History
William Hawtrey built the current mansion around 1565, and it may have involved the reconstruction of an earlier building. A reception room in the house bears his name today. Soon after its construction, Hawtrey acted as a custodian at Chequers for Lady Mary Grey, younger sister of Lady Jane Grey and great-granddaughter of King Henry VII. Lady Mary had married without the monarch's consent, and as punishment was banished from court by Queen Elizabeth I and kept confined. Lady Mary remained at Chequers for two years. The room where she slept from 1565 to 1567 remains in its original condition.

Through descent in the female line and marriages, the house passed through several families: the Wooleys, the Crokes and the Thurbanes. In 1715, the then owner of the house married John Russell, a grandson of Oliver Cromwell. The house is known for this connection to the Cromwells, and still contains a large collection of Cromwell memorabilia.

In the 19th century, the Russells (by now the Greenhill-Russell family) employed Henry Rhodes to make alterations to the house in the Gothic style. The Tudor panelling and windows were ripped out, and battlements with pinnacles installed. Toward the end of the 19th century, the house passed through marriage to the Astley family. Between 1892 and 1901, Bertram Astley restored the house to its Elizabethan origins, with advice from Sir Reginald Blomfield. The restoration and design work was completed by John Birch, architect.

20th century
In 1909, the house was taken on a long lease by Arthur Lee and his wife Ruth (an American heiress). Lee immediately re-engaged Blomfield to undertake a restoration of the interior. At the same time, Henry Avray Tipping undertook the design of several walled gardens from 1911 to 1912. In 1912, after the death of the last of the house's ancestral owners Henry Delavel Astley, Ruth Lee and her sister purchased the property and later gave it to Arthur Lee.

During the First World War, the house became a hospital and then a convalescent home for officers. After the war, Chequers became a private home again (now furnished with many 16th-century antiques and tapestries and the Cromwellian antiquities), and the childless Lees formed a plan. While previous Prime Ministers had always belonged to the landed classes, the post-First World War era was bringing in a new breed of politician. These men did not have the spacious country houses of previous prime ministers in which to entertain foreign dignitaries or a tranquil place to relax from the affairs of state. After long discussions with then Prime Minister David Lloyd George, Chequers was given to the nation as a country retreat for the serving Prime Minister under the Chequers Estate Act 1917.

The Lees, by this time Lord and Lady Lee of Fareham, left Chequers on 8 January 1921 after a final dinner at the house. A political disagreement between the Lees and Lloyd George soured the handover, which went ahead nonetheless.

A stained glass window in the long gallery of the house commissioned by Lord and Lady Lee of Fareham bears the inscription:

This house of peace and ancient memories was given to England as a thank-offering for her deliverance in the great war of 1914–1918 as a place of rest and recreation for her Prime Ministers for ever.

The property houses one of the largest collections of art and memorabilia pertaining to Oliver Cromwell in the country. It also houses many other national antiques and books, held in the famous "long room", including a diary of Admiral Lord Nelson. However, the collection is not open to the public.

Nearby Coombe Hill was part of the estate until the 1920s, when it was given to the National Trust. Coombe Hill and the Chequers Estate are part of the Chilterns Area of Outstanding Natural Beauty, designated in 1965. The landscaped park, woodlands and formal gardens surrounding Chequers are listed Grade II on the Register of Historic Parks and Gardens.

During the early part of the Second World War, it was considered that security at Chequers was inadequate to protect the Prime Minister, Winston Churchill. Therefore, he used Ditchley in Oxfordshire until late 1942, by which time the approach road, clearly visible from the sky, had been camouflaged and other security measures had been put in place.

Chequers under Neville Chamberlain had one telephone – in the kitchen; but Churchill "at once installed a whole battery on his desk and had them in constant use", according to Marshal of the Royal Air Force Lord Portal of Hungerford, who served as Chief of the Air Staff during the Second World War.

21st century
On 1 June 2007, the Chequers estate was designated as a protected site under Section 128 of the Serious Organised Crime and Police Act 2005. This specifically criminalised trespass into the estate. In July 2018, Prime Minister Theresa May held a Cabinet meeting at Chequers to agree on the UK's approach to Brexit which became known as the proposed "Chequers plan". In April 2020, Prime Minister Boris Johnson chose to recover at Chequers after being hospitalised at St Thomas's, London, with respiratory complications from COVID-19 which included a three-night stay in ICU.

Chequers as a gift 
Sir Arthur Lee donated the Chequers estate after discussions with the then Prime Minister David Lloyd George. Lee noted a new type of politician was emerging, one without large country homes to retreat to and entertain foreign dignitaries. The Chequers Estate Act 1917 contains his reasoning and thoughts for the gift:

Location

The Ridgeway National Trail crosses the private drive.

Gallery

See also
 10 Downing Street – the Prime Minister's London office and official residence of the First Lord of the Treasury.
 Chevening – the British Foreign Secretary's country residence.
 Dorneywood – another country house used by high-ranking British officials
 Camp David – the country retreat of the President of the United States
 Harrington Lakethe country retreat of the Prime Minister of Canada
 List of official residences
 Windsor Castle – the Royal Family's country residence.

References
Notes

Bibliography

External links 
 

1565 establishments in England
Buildings of the Government of the United Kingdom
Chiltern Hills
Country houses in Buckinghamshire
Elizabethan architecture
Gardens by Henry Avray Tipping
Government buildings in England
Grade I listed buildings in Buckinghamshire
Grade I listed houses
Grade II listed parks and gardens in Buckinghamshire
Houses completed in 1565
Official residences in the United Kingdom
Prime ministerial residences
Prime ministerial homes in the United Kingdom
Reginald Blomfield buildings
Wycombe District